(born 23 November 1961) is a Japanese guitarist who has played with Ai Aso, Cosmic Invention, Hazama, Ensemble Pearl, Overhang Party, Onna, Ghost, Damon & Naomi, Boris, Yura Yura Teikoku, YBO2, and The Stars (formerly known as White Heaven), among others.  He has also released a solo album, Sunset Notes.

References

Japanese rock guitarists
1961 births
Musicians from Tokyo
Living people
20th-century Japanese guitarists
21st-century Japanese guitarists